The Pagami Creek Fire was a wildfire in northern Minnesota, United States, that began with a lightning strike on August 18, 2011. After weeks of slow growth, the wildfire quickly spread to over  during several days of hot, dry, windy weather in mid-September. The fire spread beyond the Boundary Waters Canoe Area Wilderness to threaten homes and businesses. Smoke from the fires drifted east and south as far as the Upper Peninsula of Michigan, Ontario, and Chicago The fire was the largest naturally occurring wildfire in Minnesota in more than a century.

See also 
 2021 Greenwood Lake Fire

References

Further reading
Pagami Creek Fire Entrapments — Facilitated Learning Analysis
Wildfires in Minnesota
2011 in Minnesota
2011 wildfires in the United States

Photos